The National Basketball Association's Rookie of the Year Award is an annual National Basketball Association (NBA) award given to the top rookie(s) of the regular season. Initiated following the 1952–53 NBA season, it confers the Eddie Gottlieb Trophy, named after the former Philadelphia Warriors head coach. Starting with the 2022–23 NBA season, winners receive the Wilt Chamberlain Trophy, named after the former Rookie of the Year winner.

The winner is selected by a panel of United States and Canadian sportswriters and broadcasters, each casting first-, second-, and third-place votes (worth five points, three points, and one point, respectively). The player(s) with the highest point total, regardless of the number of first-place votes, wins the award.

The most recent Rookie of the Year winner is Scottie Barnes of the Toronto Raptors. Twenty-one winners were drafted first overall. Sixteen winners have also won the NBA Most Valuable Player (MVP) award in their careers with Wilt Chamberlain and Wes Unseld earning both honors the same season. Thirty of the non-active winners have been elected to the Naismith Memorial Basketball Hall of Fame. Five players won the award unanimously (by capturing all of the first-place votes)—Ralph Sampson, David Robinson, Blake Griffin, Damian Lillard, and Karl-Anthony Towns.

Patrick Ewing of Jamaica, Pau Gasol of Spain, Kyrie Irving and Ben Simmons of Australia, Andrew Wiggins of Canada, and Luka Dončić of Slovenia are the only winners not born in the United States. Three of these individuals have dual nationality by birth—Wiggins and Simmons have American fathers, and both of Irving's parents are Americans. Ewing immigrated to the Boston area at age 11, Irving moved to the United States at age 2, and Wiggins and Simmons moved to the U.S. while in high school. Gasol and Dončić are the only winners trained entirely outside the United States.

Chamberlain (Harlem Globetrotters), Gasol (FC Barcelona of Liga ACB and EuroLeague), Dončić (Real Madrid of Liga ACB and EuroLeague), and LaMelo Ball (BC Prienai of the Lithuanian Basketball League, the Los Angeles Ballers of the JBA, and the Illawarra Hawks of the NBL) all had professional careers outside the NBA prior to being drafted. Ball also had previously won the NBL Rookie of the Year Award.

Winners

Unofficial winners 
Prior to the  season, the Rookie of the Year was selected by newspaper writers; however, the NBA does not officially recognize those players as winners. The league did publish the pre-1953 winners in their 1994–95 edition of the Official NBA Guide and the 1994 Official NBA Basketball Encyclopedia, but those winners have not been listed in subsequent publications.

Teams

See also 

NBA G League Rookie of the Year Award
 NBA Rookie of the Month Award
 NBL (United States) Rookie of the Year Award

Notes

References 
General

 
 

Specific

Rookie of the Year
National Basketball Association lists
Awards established in 1953
Rookie player awards